Exeter bus station is a bus station in the English city of Exeter. It opened in 1964, and was expanded in 2021.

History 
The bus station opened on the present site on 5 July 1964, replacing another bus station on Paul Street which became a car park. Construction of a new bus station, adjacent to the existing one, started in January 2019. The construction was funded by the council. The development also included a leisure centre called St Sidwell's Point. The project had been intended to start construction in December 2018, but was delayed. Part of the former bus station remained open during construction, but some services had to call on nearby streets instead.

The new bus station opened on 25 July 2021.

Facilities 

The bus station has a fully enclosed indoor waiting area with 12 stands. Each stand has automatic doors, seats and a display showing real time information accompanied by audio announcements. Other facilities include cycle racks, disabled car parking spaces and public toilets.

Archaeology 
In 2019, during redevelopment of the bus station, remains of a Roman fort were discovered.

References 

Bus stations in England
Transport in Exeter